One Tree may refer to:

One Tree, New South Wales, a location on the Cobb Highway on the flat plain between Hay and Booligal in the Riverina district of New South Wales, Australia
The One Tree, a fantasy novel by American writer Stephen R. Donaldson

See also
One Tree Hill (disambiguation)
One Tree Hill (TV series), American TV series